The , also known as the Battle of Shimabara, was fought on May 3 of 1584 between the combined forces of the Shimazu and Arima clans, and the Ryūzōji army.

Ryūzōji Takanobu was attacking a number of independent clans close to his territories. In 1582 he attacked the Arima clan and Arima Harunobu decided to ask the help of Shimazu Yoshihisa. Yoshihisa sent an army in December of that year but not much progress was made until 1584. When the army was reorganized and commanded by the able Shimazu Iehisa, younger brother of Yoshihisa, the allies put Shimabara under siege and Takanobu marched to relieve the castle with his main army.

On May 3 the Shimazu-Arima army entrenched on a hill in front of Shimabara and received the attack of the Ryūzōji who were well armed with muskets, including high calibre ones. They attacked the hill in three columns, one advancing along the road, another advancing along the hills and a third along the beach. 

They were harassed by the Arima with large caliber arquebuses mounted on boats. The columns were defeated when the Shimazu enticed the Ryūzōji into a false retreat, Harunobu attacked the enemy's main force, and his heir Tadakata, allowing a flying column of samurai to take Ryūzōji Takanobu's head.

References 

Okitanawate
1584 in Japan
Shimazu clan
Ryūzōji clan
Conflicts in 1584